Letters from a Killer is a 1998 British-American crime drama mystery film starring Patrick Swayze as a man who is falsely convicted of the murder of his wife. During his time in jail, he finds comfort from four women with whom he corresponds. After his second court appearance, he is finally freed from prison only to be framed for yet two more murders which he did not commit.

The movie is directed by David Carson, and also stars Gia Carides, Kim Myers, Olivia Birkelund, and Tina Lifford. It was directed by David Carson and writing by John Foster, Nicholas Hicks-Beach, and Shelley Miller.

Filming locations
 Echo, Utah
 Fair Oaks, California
 Ione, California
 Jordanelle Reservoir, Utah
 Los Angeles, California
 New Orleans, Louisiana
 Reno, Nevada
 Sacramento, California
 Salt Lake City, Utah
 Wendover, Nevada
 Woodland, California
 Glendora, California

Halting of filming
Letters from a Killer was originally supposed to be finished earlier than its release, but filming was halted for two months due to Patrick Swayze suffering serious injuries when he fell off his horse in May 1997 and hit a tree. He ended up with both legs broken and four tendons in his shoulder immediately became detached. Although it was eventually released, Swayze was reported to have trouble resuming his career.

External links
 
 
 

1998 films
1998 crime thriller films
American thriller films
Films scored by Dennis McCarthy
Films set in Salt Lake City
Films shot in California
Films shot in Los Angeles
Films shot in New Orleans
Films shot in Nevada
Films shot in Utah
Films shot in Salt Lake City
1990s prison drama films
Films directed by David Carson
1990s English-language films
1990s American films